Porfimer sodium, sold as Photofrin, is a photosensitizer used in photodynamic therapy and radiation therapy and for palliative treatment of obstructing endobronchial non-small cell lung carcinoma and obstructing esophageal cancer.

Porfimer is a mixture of oligomers formed by ether and ester linkages of up to eight porphyrin units.  In practice, a red light source emitting at 630 nm is used to excite the Porfimer oligomers.

Porfimer is Haematoporphyrin Derivative (HpD) (See PDT).

Approvals and indications
It was approved in Canada in 1993 for the treatment of bladder cancer.
It was approved in Japan in 1994 (for early stage lung cancer?).
It was approved by the U.S. FDA in December 1995 for esophageal cancer, and in 1998, it was approved for the treatment of early non-small cell lung cancer.

In August 2003 the FDA approved its use for Barrett's esophagus.

References

External links
Photofrin 
Photofrin marketing info 
Side effects of PDT with Photofrin
History of Photofrin

Photosensitizing agents
Porphyrins